Mystery of the Red Jungle (also known as Operation Hong Kong) is a 1964 German-French-Italian adventure-spy film directed by Helmut Ashley and starring Maria Perschy, Dietmar Schönherr, and Brad Harris.

Plot

Cast

References

External links

1964 films
1960s adventure thriller films
West German films
German adventure thriller films
French adventure thriller films
Italian adventure thriller films
Films directed by Helmut Ashley
Films set in Hong Kong
Films about the illegal drug trade
1960s German films
1960s Italian films
1960s French films